Ava Patrya Yndia Yracema Gaitan Rocha (born 21 March 1979) is a Brazilian singer-songwriter.

Biography
Born in Rio de Janeiro, the daughter of the director Glauber and the visual artist , Rocha started her career in theatre, with the stage company Teatro Oficina in São Paulo with whom she made her debut as an actress in 2006. She began her musical career in 2008 with a band bearing her name, "AVA", with whom she released her first album in 2011.

The album was also included in the list of the best albums of 2015, published by the New York Times. In 2018, she released her second album, Trança, launched by the single "Joana Dark".

She is married to Negro Leo, author of several songs for Rocha including the single Você Não Vai Passar, winner in 2015 of the Multishow Award in the category "Novo Hit".

Discography

Studio albums

     2011 - Diurno (as AVA)
     2015 - Ava Patrya Yndia Yracema
     2018 - Trança

References

External links 
 
 

1979 births
Living people
Musicians from Rio de Janeiro (city)
Brazilian singer-songwriters 
Música Popular Brasileira singers
21st-century Brazilian singers
21st-century Brazilian women singers
Women in Latin music